The Chinese Ambassador to Mozambique is the official representative of the People's Republic of China to the Republic of Mozambique.

List of representatives

References 

 
Mozambique
China